Yeong-nam, also spelled Young-nam, Yong-nam, is a Korean masculine given name. Its meaning differs based on the hanja used to write each syllable of the name.

Hanja
There are 34 hanja with the reading "yeong" and five hanja with the reading "nam" on the South Korean government's official list of hanja which may be used in given names. Ways of writing this name in hanja include:

 (길 영/읊을 영 gil yeong / eulpeul yeong, 사내 남 sanae nam): "eternal man". These characters are also used to write various Japanese given names, including Hisao, Norio, and Tsuneo.

People
People with this name include:
Kim Yong-nam (born 1928), North Korean politician, Chairman of the Presidium of the Supreme People's Assembly
Jo Young-nam (born 1945), South Korean singer and television personality
Kim Young-nam (born 1960), retired South Korean male Greco-Roman wrestler
Moon Young-nam (born 1960), South Korean television screenwriter
Jang Young-nam (born 1973), South Korean actress
Choi Young-nam (born 1984), South Korean football player 
Kim Yeong-nam (diver) (born 1996), South Korean diver

See also
List of Korean given names
Kim Yeong-nam (disambiguation)

References

Korean unisex given names